William Dixon Maddren (11 January 1951 – 30 August 2000) was an English professional football player and manager. A one-club man, he made all his professional club appearances for Middlesbrough between 1968 and 1979, and went on to manage the club from 1984 to 1986.

Playing career

Club career 
Maddren made his debut on 12 April 1969 against Bury scoring a goal and suffering a broken nose. Despite starting his Boro career as a striker he was known as a central defender. In the 1970–71 season Maddren established himself in the Boro defence. In 1971, Middlesbrough manager Stan Anderson bought Mansfield Town central defender Stuart Boam to form a defensive partnership with Maddren. In 1973, after repeated failures to gain promotion to the old First Division, Anderson left Middlesbrough and was replaced by World Cup winner Jack Charlton.

In the 1973–74 season Middlesbrough ran away with the old Second Division finishing 15 points clear from second place Luton Town (Under the old points system of 2 points for a win.) They were promoted to the First Division on 23 March 1974, finishing the season conceding only 30 goals, keeping 25 clean sheets in a 42-game programme. Maddren's final appearance for Boro was on 3 September 1977 against West Bromwich Albion. He was only 26. Maddren had a persistent knee injury and he often played games when in pain. An operation was unsuccessful and he retired in 1979.

International career 
Maddren played for England under-23's five times. He was called up to the senior side, but never made an appearance.

Management career
When Malcolm Allison became Middlesbrough manager in 1982 Maddren returned to Ayresome Park as physiotherapist. By then Boro were struggling in the old Second Division. Allison was sacked on 24 March 1984, and was replaced by Jack Charlton as caretaker manager with Maddren as assistant. The new management team helped to avoid relegation and Maddren was promoted to post of manager at the season's end. In his first full season, 1984–85, Middlesbrough struggled and avoided relegation on the last day of the season. The following season Maddren was sacked with 13 games remaining, replaced by his assistant Bruce Rioch. Boro were relegated at the end of the season to the Third Division and the club went into liquidation.

Following his sacking Maddren concentrated on his sports shop business. The Willie Maddren Trophy is a charity football competition, whose proceeds go towards the Mike Findley MND Fund.

Illness
In 1995, Maddren was diagnosed with a terminal muscle-wasting disease motor neurone disease (MND). He became a campaigner for MND research, raising over £200,000 including £40,000 from his autobiography Extra Time. In 1996, a benefit match was arranged at the Riverside Stadium between Middlesbrough and Internazionale.

Death
He died on 30 August 2000 at a hospice in Stockton-on-Tees, aged 49.

Sources

Obituary From a nostalgic football site
Boro's Best (1997) A book detailing Boro's top 50 players as chosen by players and fans.
An Essential History of Middlesbrough (2002)Usual statistics
Middlesbrough v Inter Milan Matchday magazine (1996)Includes interviews with Maddren

External links
Middlesbrough F.C.Official Website
Interview with Hilary Maddren
Obituary
MND Association
 BBC footage of Willie Maddren's 1978 testimonial

1951 births
2000 deaths
People from Billingham
English footballers
England under-23 international footballers
Middlesbrough F.C. players
English football managers
Middlesbrough F.C. managers
Neurological disease deaths in England
Deaths from motor neuron disease
Association football defenders
Middlesbrough F.C. non-playing staff
Footballers from County Durham